The 2010–11 LNAH season was the 15th season of the Ligue Nord-Américaine de Hockey (before 2004 the Quebec Semi-Pro Hockey League), a minor professional league in the Canadian province of Quebec. Seven teams participated in the regular season, and Saint-Francois de Sherbrooke won the league title.

Regular season

Coupe Canam-Playoffs

External links 
 LNAH Official Website

Ligue Nord-Américaine de Hockey seasons
3